The Willcox AVA is an American Viticultural Area located in southeastern Arizona, centered around the city of Willcox where it is bisected by Interstate 10. Approximately 85% of wine grapes from Arizona are grown within the AVA boundaries. The AVA consists mostly of flat terrain at over 4,000 feet in elevation, including the Aravaipa Valley and much of Sulphur Springs Valley. The AVA is one of the three major centers of viticulture in Arizona, along with Sonoita and the Verde Valley in central Arizona. Just east of the AVA are Fort Bowie National Historic Site, Chiricahua National Monument, and Coronado National Forest.

See also
 Arizona wine

References

External links
 Willcox Wine Country consortium

American Viticultural Areas
Arizona wine